The UAZ-469 is an off-road military light utility vehicle manufactured by UAZ. It was used by Soviet and other Warsaw Pact armed forces, as well as paramilitary units in Eastern Bloc countries. In the Soviet Union, it also saw widespread service in state organizations that needed a robust and durable off-road vehicle. Standard military versions included seating for seven personnel.

History
Developed from the GAZ-69, UAZ-471 and UAZ-460, the UAZ-469 was introduced in 1971 to replace the GAZ-69. It is powered by the same   UMZ-452MI inline-four engine as the UAZ-452 and is able to run on gasoline with an octane rating as low as 72 (although 76 was preferred). The UAZ-469 presented two great advantages: it was able to drive in virtually any terrain and it was very easy to repair. The vehicle was originally not available for purchase by the public, but many were sold as surplus to private owners.

After slight modernisation in 1985, due to new industry designation standards, they were renamed: the UAZ-469 became the UAZ-3151, while the UAZ-469B became the UAZ-31512. Manufacture of the UAZ-31512 for the Russian Army continued until 2011, while manufacture for the civilian market was discontinued due to new emission standards. However, the currently manufactured UAZ Hunter is an updated version of the old UAZ-469B. The Hunter was originally sold in Germany and some Asian countries as the "UAZ Tigr" (Tiger), until General Motors complained that the name was too similar to the Opel Tigra, and in Germany, it was renamed "Baijah Taigah".

The UAZ-469 was exported to eighty countries, and between 1.65 to 2 million units of the vehicle and its variants were produced.

Major versions

UAZ-469B – a "civilian" version of the UAZ-469. In this version, the ground clearance is 220 mm and the drive axles use a single-stage main gear without the final drive. The UAZ-469B was available with a contact or contactless (on later models) electronic ignition system. Its PTO shafts are slightly longer than the shafts of the UAZ-469 vehicle. The cabin is open and came with a detachable canvas roof; a hard-top roof made of metal or fiberglass could be purchased as an accessory. The 2.4-litre engine is paired with a four-speed transmission.

In Mexico, a special package called Vallarta Kit, named after the beach resort of Puerto Vallarta, was released featuring a winch, steering assembly and gearbox reinforcement, snorkel, suspension kit and LED headlights, among other extras.

A police patrol car version was available, based on the UAZ-31512-UMM with an insulated five-door metal body and optional special equipment. The UAZ-469B formed the basis of the TREKOL-39041 amphibious vehicle.

Other variants
 UAZ-469BI – 469B version with shielded electrical equipment (for example, P-403M microwave transceiver VHF radio)
 UAZ-469BG – medical utility version, equipped with places for nurses and a stretcher; after modernization in 1985, it received the designation UAZ-3152.
 UAZ-469 WZMot-4 – Polish ambulance version with stretched patient compartment, upgraded from UAZ-469BG
 UAZ-469RH – version modified for nuclear, biological, and chemical (NBC) resistance
 UAZ-39294 - variant with low pressure tires

Concepts and prototypes

 UAZ-3907 Ягуар (Jaguar) – amphibious vehicle based on the UAZ-469 with two propellers mounted to the rear axle
 UAZ-Martorelli – UAZ-469B version that was exported to Italy, where it was significantly modified. These versions included:
 with Russian UMP-451M petrol engine (2,500 cm3, 75 hp), called the "UAZ-Explorer"
 with a Peugeot XD2 diesel (2,500 cm 3, 76 hp) – UAZ-Marathon
 with a turbodiesel Vittorio Martorelli VM Motori (2,400 cm3, 100 hp) - UAZ-Dakar,
 with a Fiat petrol engine (2,000 cm 3, 112 hp) – UAZ-Racing
 UAZ-3105 (or UAZ-3150) Cпорт (Sport) – a short wheelbase (2000mm) version with removable roof and doors
 UAZ-3171/3172 - variant with rebodied body and rectangular headlights

Users

 
 
 
 
 
 
 
 
 
 
 
 
 
 
 
 
 
 
 
 
 
 
 
 
 
 
 
 
  
 
 
 
 
 
 
 
 
 
 
 
 
 
 
 
  Transnistria

Former users

Gallery

Specifications

Engine 2,450 cc petrol, in-line 4-cylinder, water cooled,  at 4,000 rpm,  at 2,200 rpm
Fuel Carburettor system, uses 76-octane petrol, tank capacity is 78 litres
Transmission 4-speed manual gearbox, 2-speed transfer case, 4-wheel drive
Front axle Live axle with coil springs, drum brakes
Rear axle Live axle with leaf springs, drum brakes

Dimensions and weights
 Empty weight with fuel: 
 Max. gross weight: 
 External dimensions: (length/width/height):  ×  × 
 Wheelbase: 
 Tread front/rear: /
 Ground clearance: 
 Tire size: 215 SR 15
 Wheel size: 6L×15

See also
 Willys MB, the US off-road vehicle of World War II. Other similar vehicles include the Jeep CJ and the Jeep Wrangler.

References

External links

 UAZ company
 UAZ owners group
 official web site
 Italian owners group
 UAZ tuning Gallery
 Video of Tuned UAZs in extreme off-road
 Video of stock UAZ from Poland
 UAZ 469 Instruction Manual (cz)
 UAZ 3151 Instruction Manual (en)

Military vehicles of the Soviet Union
Soviet automobiles
Military light utility vehicles
UAZ
Military vehicles of Russia
Cars of Russia
Military vehicles introduced in the 1970s
Compact sport utility vehicles
1970s cars
1980s cars
1990s cars
2000s cars
2010s cars
Police vehicles
All-wheel-drive vehicles